Ross McFarlane (born 25 May 1961) is an English professional golfer.

McFarlane was born in Manchester, and is the son of Manchester United footballer Noel. He turned professional in 1979 and played on the European Tour for many years, making the top 100 in the Order of Merit seven times, with a best ranking of 26th in 1997. That year he collected his only European Tour tournament win at the Deutsche Bank Open TPC of Europe, which earned him a five-year exemption on tour.

Having struggled to build on that win, in 2001 McFarlane played only a few tournaments as he joined Sky Sports as a golf commentator, despite still having over a year left on his European Tour exemption. He has also worked for the Golf Channel.

On 30 January 2014, McFarlane was given a suspended prison sentence of ten months and forced to sign the sex offenders register for 10 years, for being in possession of over 150 indecent images of children. Four weeks later, he was re-arrested. On 3 March, he was jailed for 18 months after being caught alone with two children after he was banned from such contact as part of his suspended sentence. He was also found to have used his Xbox to view child pornography.

Professional wins (2)

European Tour wins (1)

Other wins (1)
1987 Midland Professional Championship

Results in major championships

Note: McFarlane only played in The Open Championship.

CUT = missed the half-way cut
"T" = tied

External links

English male golfers
European Tour golfers
Golf writers and broadcasters
British sports broadcasters
1961 births
Living people